Francisco Plaza Trinidad (born 8 February 1973), simply known as Paco Plaza, is a Spanish filmmaker known for his works in the horror genre. He is the co-creator of the REC zombie film franchise.

Career
Francisco Plaza Trinidad was born on 8 February 1973 in Valencia. Plaza has a degree in Audiovisual Communication from CEU Cardinal Herrera University and a diploma in Film Direction from the ECAM. He speaks Spanish, English and French.

Although he is best known as a director, he is also a screenwriter, producer, editor and even was a costume designer on one occasion for Tropismos (1995), his first short film and with which he made his debut as a director.

Paco is known in Spanish cinema and abroad for the creation of the trilogy REC (2007). A year after the release of the first film, American director John Erick Dowdle made an adaptation of the Paco Plaza film, under the name of Quarantine (2008). The trilogy REC has accumulated a total of 26 awards and 17 nominations in numerous film festivals.

Filmography

Film

As actor

Producer only

Short Film

Television

As actor

References

External links

Spanish film directors
1973 births
Living people
Horror film directors
People from Valencia
21st-century Spanish screenwriters